Maura Viceconte (3 October 1967 – 10 February 2019) was an Italian long-distance runner who represented her native country twice (1996 and 2000) at the Summer Olympics.

Biography 
Viceconte is best known for winning the bronze medal at the 1998 European Championships in Budapest, Hungary. She won three marathons during her career: Rome (1999), Vienna (2000), and Prague (2001).

Her personal best time of 2:23:47 hours set at the Vienna City Marathon in 2000 stood as the Italian national record until April 2012, when it was beaten by Valeria Straneo.

On 10 February 2019, Viceconte committed suicide by hanging, at the age of 51.

Achievements

See also
 Italian all-time lists - 5000 metres
 Italian all-time lists - 10000 metres
 Italian all-time lists - Half marathon
 Italian all-time lists - Marathon

References

External links
 
 Maura Viceconte at RAI

1967 births
2019 suicides
People from Susa, Piedmont
Italian female long-distance runners
Italian female marathon runners
Athletes (track and field) at the 1996 Summer Olympics
Athletes (track and field) at the 2000 Summer Olympics
Olympic athletes of Italy
European Athletics Championships medalists
Suicides by hanging in Italy
Sportspeople from the Metropolitan City of Turin
Female suicides
20th-century Italian women
21st-century Italian women